Thomaz Ruan de Moraes is a Brazilian Paralympic athlete. He won the silver medal in the men's 400 metres T47 event at the 2020 Summer Paralympics held in Tokyo, Japan.

References

External links 
 

Living people
Year of birth missing (living people)
Place of birth missing (living people)
Brazilian male sprinters
Paralympic athletes of Brazil
Athletes (track and field) at the 2020 Summer Paralympics
Medalists at the 2020 Summer Paralympics
Paralympic silver medalists for Brazil
Medalists at the World Para Athletics Championships
21st-century Brazilian people